ATV Offroad Fury 2 is a racing video game developed by Rainbow Studios and published by Sony Computer Entertainment, released exclusively for the PlayStation 2. It is a sequel to ATV Offroad Fury, and is the first in the series to support online multiplayer, using both broadband and dial-up connection. It was released on November 9, 2002 in North America and on October 3, 2003 in Europe.

The game was succeeded by ATV Offroad Fury 3 in 2004.

Gameplay
Expanding from its predecessor, ATV Offroad Fury 2 features more ATVs (including Ravage Talons), along with more vehicles, mini-games, championships, and others. The ATVs do not suffer damage, but their occupants are vulnerable to dismounts from ATVs, if the vehicle lands poorly or another racer lands on the player. Also, after riding for an extended period of time, the ATVs will become dirty. They can be cleaned by resetting or driving into the water. However, if the player stays in the deep water for more than 5 seconds, they are teleported out of the water. If the player drives out of bounds, they will dismount from their ATV and fly through the air. The game also features new point-earning tricks, as well as championships where players can earn profile points for each race completed. Completing championships will unlock a new event such as Freestyle events, which objective the players must complete within the time limit. The game also offers minigames.

ATV Offroad Fury 2 is also the first installment in the series to offer online play, which allows players to challenge other players over an online network (including a set of Lobbies), connected via i-Link, local area network (LAN) or other network connections.

The range of stunts featured in ATV Offroad Fury 2 are typically activated by tapping a combination of buttons while the player's ATV is in the air, to activate stunt-based combo moves. Each set of tricks also require a different amount of time to perform.

Reception

ATV Offroad Fury 2 received "generally positive" reviews, according to review aggregator Metacritic.

IGN gave the game 9 out of 10, praising the gameplay, but criticizing the soundtrack. GameSpot gave the game 7 out of 10, noting the lack of changes from the previous game.

References

External links

2002 video games
ATV Offroad Fury
Multiplayer and single-player video games
MX vs. ATV
PlayStation 2 games
PlayStation 2-only games
Racing video games
Sony Interactive Entertainment games
Video games developed in the United States
Rainbow Studios games